The Football WA 2009 season was the 113th year of the football in Western Australia before the new banner of National Premier Leagues in 2014. The competition consisted of 12 teams, each playing a total of 22 games in the season with the premier team being Western Knights, marking their third premiership of the competition. The team to be relegated would be Canning City.

Pre-season changes

Table

Finals

References

2009
2009 in Australian soccer